535 Mission Street is an office skyscraper in the South of Market district of San Francisco, California, opened in November 2014, with 27 stories rising  above street level. It is adjacent to the Transbay Transit Center site and located on the same block as 100 First Plaza, 555 Mission Street, and 101 Second Street.

History
The Environmental Impact Report was certified in 1986, but the project was subsequently withdrawn by the developers and never built. Following the dot-com crash, Hines Interests Limited Partnership took over the project and in 2002 demolished the existing structures and built a temporary parking lot until the economy recovered.

With the office market slow to recover, the site was sold in 2003 to Monahan Pacific for $19.2 million, with plans to switch the development to condominiums. However, by 2006, citing an "overheated" residential real estate market, Monahan Pacific sold the development site to Beacon Capital Partners for $30 million, who changed the plans back to offices.

Beacon broke ground on 535 Mission during the summer of 2008, driving piles and laying the building's foundation. In October, with the onset of the 2008 financial crisis, construction on the building was halted. After lying dormant for four years, the site was sold along with already purchased construction materials to Boston Properties for $71 million. Boston Properties restarted construction in 2013. Topping-out ceremonies were held on January 8, 2014 and the building opened in November 2014. The building was planned to attain LEED Gold status upon completion. As of 2014, one third of the space was occupied by Trulia, a real estate website company.

The 535 Mission Project in San Francisco features a 4 sided SSG Facade installed by Architectural Glass and Aluminum.San Francisco Chronicle architecture critic John King stated that 535 Mission Street "isn’t a masterpiece", but praised its architectural restraint, with an "unusual but understated form [that] is emphasized by the sleek glass skin, where sometimes, especially near dusk or dawn, each side reads as a single blue or silver pane."

See also

List of tallest buildings in San Francisco

References

External links

Skyscraper office buildings in San Francisco
South of Market, San Francisco
HOK (firm) buildings
Office buildings completed in 2014
Leadership in Energy and Environmental Design platinum certified buildings